Hamdun ibn al Hajj or in full Abu al-Fayd Hamdun ibn Abd al-Rahman ibn Hamdun ibn Abd al-Rahman Mohammed ibn al-Hajj al-Fasi al-Sulami al-Mirdasi (1760–1817) was one of the most outstanding scholars of the reign of moulay Soulayman of Morocco. He was a committed Tijani Sufi but also an outspoken critic of some of the  practices of Sufism in that time. Hamdun ibn al Hajj was also one of the best known poets of the period and author of a diwan (Silsilat Dhakhair al-turath al-adabi bi-al-Maghrib). He also wrote a commentary on Ibn Hajar al-Asqalani's Muqaddimah, a gloss on Taftazani's treatise on the Mukhtasar and a series of Diwans including a controversial poem dedicated to Amir Sau'ud b. 'Abd al-'Aziz.

References

18th-century Moroccan poets
Moroccan Sufis
Moroccan Maliki scholars
1760 births
1817 deaths
People from Fez, Morocco
18th-century Moroccan people
19th-century Moroccan people
19th-century Moroccan poets